Maxime Minot (born 20 July 1987) is a French politician who has represented the 7th constituency of the Oise department in the National Assembly since 2017. A member of the The Republicans (LR), he previously held the mayorship of Étouy from 2014 to 2017. Minot has also held a seat in the Departmental Council of Oise for the canton of Clermont since 2021.

Political career 
In the 2017 presidential elections, Minot publicly denounced his party's candidate François Fillon amid the so-called Fillon affair and instead voted for Emmanuel Macron.

Minot was elected to the French Parliament at the 2017 legislative election. He has since been serving on the Committee on Cultural Affairs and Education. In addition to his committee assignments, he is part of the French delegation to the Inter-Parliamentary Union (IPU).

In late 2019, Minot endorsed Damien Abad as chairman of the Republicans' parliamentary group.

Personal life 
In July 2020, Minot came out as gay.

References

External links 
 National Assembly biography
 Twitter

1987 births
Living people
People from Oise
Politicians from Hauts-de-France
Mayors of places in Hauts-de-France
Departmental councillors (France)
The Republicans (France) politicians
Gay politicians
LGBT conservatism
LGBT legislators in France
Deputies of the 15th National Assembly of the French Fifth Republic
Deputies of the 16th National Assembly of the French Fifth Republic